Topias Leinonen (born 25 January 2004) is a Finnish professional ice hockey goaltender who currently plays with JYP Jyväskylä of the Finnish Liiga. Leinonen was selected 41st overall by the Buffalo Sabres in the 2nd round of the 2022 NHL Entry Draft.

Playing career 
After playing for Ilves in his youth, Leinonen moved to JYP's Under-16 program. He played for the JYP Under-16 team in 2018-19, and the Under-18 team in 2019-20. After playing 15 for the Under-20 team in 2020-21, Leinonen played 21 games for the Under-20 team in the 2021-22 season and played 4 games in Liiga for the senior team. 

In 2021-22 he spent time on loan with KeuPa HT of Mestis.

Going into the 2022 NHL Entry Draft, Leinonen was regarded as the top goaltending prospect and was ranked as the top European goalie by NHL Central Scouting. He was drafted 41st overall by the Buffalo Sabres, as the first goaltender selected in the 2022 NHL Entry Draft. He attended the Buffalo Sabres Development Camp in July 2022.

International play 
Leinonen represented Finland at the 2020 Winter Youth Olympics, where he played 10 games with a .877 save percentage.

Leinonen represented Finland at the 2022 IIHF World U18 Championships, where he recorded a 2.61 goals against average and a .897 save percentage in 5 games played.

Career statistics

Regular season and playoffs

International

References

External links 
 

2004 births
21st-century Finnish people
Buffalo Sabres draft picks
Finnish ice hockey goaltenders
Sportspeople from Central Finland
JYP Jyväskylä players
KeuPa HT players
Liiga players
Living people